Medan Cathedral (Indonesian: Gereja Katedral Medan) is a Roman Catholic Cathedral in Medan, Indonesia. The current cathedral was inaugurated in 1928. It is one of the Dutch colonial buildings in Medan.

History

At its inception in 1879, the Cathedral Church of Medan is a leaf-roofed hut and thatched roofed place of worship for dozens of Catholics (the majority ethnic Tamil Indian and the Netherlands) at Jl Pemuda No 1 (formerly: Paleisstraat; Istana Street). In 1884, the congregation had grown to 193 people.

Construction of a new church was initiated in 1905 when the Catholics were numbered 1200 people. The construction was carried out by the Jesuit priest who worked in the field. The new church was inaugurated in November of that year, the new church was made of stone walls and tin roof, with some parts still made of thatched palm leaves.

The Tamil Indians later built for themselves a Parish at Jalan Hayam Wuruk in Medan Baru area, called as St. Anthony's Church, annexed to it were housing of Tamil Catholic Indians known as Kampung Kristen or Kovil Kambam in Tamil, Presently Jalan Mataram where the Catholic Center is built.

On January 30, 1928, the church was expanded into its current form following a design by Dutch architect Han Groenewegen.

See also

Catholicism in Indonesia
List of church buildings in Indonesia

References

1928 establishments in the Dutch East Indies
Dutch colonial architecture
Roman Catholic cathedrals in Indonesia
Churches in Sumatra
Buildings and structures in Medan
Roman Catholic churches completed in 1928
20th-century Roman Catholic church buildings in Indonesia